Pieter Burman (23 October 1713 – 24 June 1778), also known as Peter or Pieter Burmann and distinguished from his uncle as  ( or ), was a Dutch philologist.

Life
Born at Amsterdam, he was brought up by his uncle in Leiden, and afterwards studied law and philology under CA Duker and Arnold von Drakenborch at Utrecht. In 1735 he was appointed professor of eloquence and history at Franeker, with which the chair of poetry was combined in 1741. In the following year he left Franeker for Amsterdam to become professor of history and philology at the Athenaeum Illustre of Amsterdam. He was subsequently professor of poetry (1744), general librarian (1752), and inspector of the gymnasium (1753). In 1777 he retired, and died on 24 June 1778 at Santhorst, near Wassenaar.

He resembled his more famous uncle in the manner and direction of his studies, and in his violent disposition, which involved him in quarrels with contemporaries, notably Saxe and Christian Adolph Klotz. He was a man of extensive learning, and had a great talent for Latin poetry. His most valuable works are:
Anthologia Veterum Latinorum Epigrammatum et Poematum (1759–1763)
Aristophanis comoediae Novem (1760)
Rhetorica.

He completed the editions of Vergil (1767) and Claudian (1760), which had been left unfinished by his uncle, and commenced an edition of Propertius, one of his best works, which was only half printed at the time of his death. It was completed by L. van Santen and published in 1780.

Notes

References
 
 Volume I
 Volume II
 Volume III
 Volume IV

1713 births
1788 deaths
18th-century Latin-language writers
18th-century male writers
Linguists from the Netherlands
Dutch historians
Literature educators
Academic staff of the University of Amsterdam
New Latin-language poets
Utrecht University alumni
Academic staff of the University of Franeker